Alawite revolt may refer to: 
Alawite revolt (1834–35)
Alawite revolt of 1919

See also
 Sectarianism and minorities in the Syrian Civil War